The Lebanese Scouting Federation, is the national federation of 29 Scouting organisations of Lebanon, founded in 1961. The federation became a member of the World Organization of the Scout Movement in 1947.

History
Scouting was introduced in Lebanon by two teachers, Abdul Satar and Mohammad Abdul Jabbar Khairy who received support from Toufik El Hibri. They came to Lebanon from England in 1912 and established the first Scout troop in the school owned by El Hibri, where they worked. This troop had many activities, later including a trip to Istanbul, Ottoman Empire, where they met with Sultan Mehmed V. Members of this troop played an important role in spreading the Scouting and Guiding movement in Lebanon and other countries.

After Lebanon gained its independence in 1943, Scouting further spread rapidly to cover every part of the country. 

During the Lebanese civil war, Scouts from all associations played an important role in helping civilians, distributing food, medicine, and other forms of aid to refugees. Some Scouting associations formed first aid groups that helped the wounded. Scouts also participated in peace campaigns to help put an end to that war. During the war, Scouts from all sides of the conflict remained brothers and remained in contact with each other, manifesting a good example of unity for all Lebanese. All this added to the reputation of Scouting in Lebanon, with Lebanese people tending to respect Scouts and many parents encouraging their children to join the movement.

Today, years after the end of the civil war, Scouting in Lebanon still faces great tasks, with Lebanon being involved in large reconstruction plans aimed to erase effects of the war and to enable it to regain its advanced role in the region and the world. The role of the Scouts include promoting peace and unity through campaigns and summer camps for youth and children. 

In 1973, Muhammad El Hibri was awarded the Bronze Wolf, the only distinction of the World Organization of the Scout Movement, awarded by the World Scout Committee for exceptional services to world Scouting. Other recipients include Dr. Farid Karam in 1977 and Rashid Shoucair in 1981.

The Arab Regional Jamboree was planned to be held in Lebanon in August 2006. However, without a stable and peaceful environment, the leaders of the Arab Scout Region decided to defer the date of the event to be in Beirut during 2007.

Organisation

Membership
The following 30 organisations are members of the federation, including an overall estimated membership of 100,000 Scouts: while the membership number reported to the World Organization of the Scout Movement stood at 14,334 Scouts in 2005.

 Al-Aamiely Scouts - Scouts al Amily
 Al-Etihady Lebanese Scouts
 Al-Jarrah Scouts in Lebanon - Scouts Al Jarrah
 Al-Mabarrat Scouts
 Al-Mahaba Scouts
 Al Mashari Scouts Association - Scouts des Macharihs
 Al-Nahda Scouts
 Al-Sahel Scouts in Lebanon
 Al-Takadomy Scouts
 Association of Arab Scouts in Lebanon - Association des Scouts arabes au Liban
 Byblos Scout - Scouts de Byblos
 Cedars Scouts - Scouts des Cèdres
 Christian Scouts - Scouts Chrétiens
 Environmental Scouts
 Future Lebanon Scouts - Scouts du Liban futur
 Imam al-Mahdi Scouts
 Independence Scouts - Scouts de l'Indépendance
 Islamic Risala Scout Association
 Lebanese Eghatha Scouts
 Lebanese Scout Association - Eclaireurs du Liban
 Lebanese Syriac Scouts - Scouts syriaques libanais
 Lycée National Scout Association - Scouts du Lycée National
 Makassed Islamic Scout Organization - Scouts musulmans du Makkassed
 Maronite Scouts - Scouts maronites
 Muslim Scout Association of Lebanon
 National Education Scouts - Scouts de l'Education Nationale
 National Lebanese Scouts - Scouts nationaux libanais
 National Orthodox Scout Association - Scout national orthodoxe
 Orthodox Scouts of Beirut - Scouts Orthodoxes de Beyrouth

 Scouts de Secours
 Scouts of Homenetmen Lebanon - Scouts Homentmens
 Scouts of Lebanon - Les Scouts du Liban

Insignia
The membership badge of the Lebanese Scouting Federation and many of the member Scout emblems incorporate the Cedar of Lebanon, the national symbol.

The Scout Motto is Be Prepared (Kun Musta'idan), and also Always Ready in Armenian. The Arabic language noun for a single Scout is Kashaf.

See also
Fédération Libanaise des Eclaireuses et des Guides
Georges El Ghorayeb
Sarah Rita Kattan

References 

Scouting 'Round the World, John S. Wilson, first edition, Blandford Press 1959.

Scouting and Guiding in Lebanon
Youth organizations established in 1961
World Organization of the Scout Movement member organizations